The 2000 Asian Judo Championships were held in Osaka, Japan 26 May to 28 May 2000.

Medal overview

Men's events

Women's events

Medals table

External links
 
 Result of the Asian Judo Championships (Judo Union of Asia)

Asian Championships
Asian Judo Championships
Asian Judo Championships
J
Asian Judo
Sport in Osaka
Asian Championships 2000
May 2000 sports events in Asia